The 1952–53 Football League season was Birmingham City Football Club's 50th in the Football League and their 22nd in the Second Division. They finished in sixth position in the 22-team division. They entered the 1952–53 FA Cup at the third round proper and lost to Tottenham Hotspur in the sixth round (quarter-final) after two replays.

Twenty-seven players made at least one appearance in nationally organised first-team competition, and there were fifteen different goalscorers. Full-back Ken Green was ever-present through the 49-game season, and Peter Murphy was top scorer with 26 goals, of which 20 came in the league.

Football League Second Division

League table (part)

FA Cup

Appearances and goals

Players with name struck through and marked  left the club during the playing season.

See also
Birmingham City F.C. seasons

References
General
 
 
 Source for match dates and results: 
 Source for lineups, appearances, goalscorers and attendances: Matthews (2010), Complete Record, pp. 340–41.
 Source for kit: "Birmingham City". Historical Football Kits. Retrieved 22 May 2018.

Specific

Birmingham City F.C. seasons
Birmingham City